Henry James Bradley  (9 November 1904 – 1 November 1991) was a British journalist and trade unionist.

Bradley was born in Lawkland, Craven, Yorkshire. He began work as a journalist with the Craven Chronicle, then moved to the Evening Chronicle in Manchester, where he remained for many years.  He joined the National Union of Journalists (NUJ) in 1923, and gradually came to prominence in the union, being elected to its National Executive Committee in 1945, and then as the union's general secretary in 1952.

Under Bradley's leadership, membership of the NUJ increased significantly; by his retirement in 1969, it had doubled to over 24,000.  From 1964 to 1970, he also served as president of the International Federation of Journalists.

In 1969, Bradley was made an Officer of the Order of the British Empire.

References

1904 births
1991 deaths
English journalists
General Secretaries of the National Union of Journalists
Officers of the Order of the British Empire
People from Craven District
Presidents of the National Union of Journalists